An eruption cyst, or eruption hematoma, is a bluish swelling that occurs on the soft tissue over an erupting tooth.  It is usually found in children. The fluid in the cyst is sometimes clear creating a pale-coloured cyst although often they are blue. An eruption cyst (eruption hematoma) is a developmental soft-tissue cyst of odontogenic origin that forms over an erupting tooth. most commonly seen anterior to first molar

Clinical features
common in children while rare in other ages and found in both dentition
forms superficially in the gingiva overlying the involved erupting tooth as soft, rounded and bluish swelling.

Histopathological features
The epithelial lining of eruption cyst is similar to that of the dentigerous cyst (non-keratinized stratified squamous epithelium), so the eruption cyst is considered a superficial dentigerous cyst.
The fibrous capsule shows inflammatory cells possibly as a result of trauma.
The epithelial lining of the cyst is separated from the alveolar mucosa by a thin layer of fibrous tissue with the epithelial tags of cystic epithelium facing those of the alveolar mucosa. 
The cystic cavity may contain blood in addition to the yellowish protein fluid as a result of trauma.

Management
The cyst roof may be drained with its fluid to allow the tooth to erupt although most of them burst spontaneously.

References 

Dentistry